Micro Units Development and Refinance Agency Bank (or MUDRA Bank)) is a public sector financial institution in India. It provides loans at low rates to micro-finance institutions and non-banking financial institutions which then provide credit to MSMEs. It was launched by Prime Minister Narendra Modi on 8 April 2015.

Overview
The formation of the agency was initially announced in the 2015 Union budget of India in February 2015. It was formally launched on 8 April.

The MUDRA banks were set up under the Pradhan Mantri MUDRA Yojana scheme. It will provide its services to small entrepreneurs outside the service area of regular banks, by using last mile agents. About 5.77 crore (57.6 million) small business have been identified as target clients using the NSSO survey of 2013. Only 4% of these businesses get finance from regular banks. The bank will also ensure that its clients do not fall into indebtedness and will lend responsibly.

MUDRA has been initially formed as a wholly owned subsidiary of Small Industries Development bank of India (SIDBI) with 100% capital being contributed by it. Presently, the authorized capital of MUDRA is 1000 crores and paid up capital is 750 crore, fully subscribed by SIDBI. More capital is expected to enhance the functioning of MUDRA.

This Agency would be responsible for developing and refinancing all Micro-enterprises sector by supporting the finance Institutions which are in the business of lending to micro / small business entities engaged in manufacturing, trading and service activities. MUDRA would partner with Banks, MFIs and other lending institutions at state level / regional level to provide micro finance support to the micro enterprise sector in the country.

The bank will classify its clients into three categories and the maximum allowed loan sums will be based on the category:
 Shishu (शिशु): Allowed loans up to 
 Kishor (किशोर): Allowed loans up to 
 Tarun (तरुण): Allowed loans up to 

 40% to Shishu
 35% to Kishor
 25% to Tarun

Those eligible to borrow from MUDRA bank are
 Small manufacturing unit
 Shopkeepers
 Fruit and vegetable vendors
 Artisans

See also
 Small Industries Development Bank of India
 Financial inclusion
हिंदी में पढ़ेंने के लिए नीचे  क्लिक करे
Application Form For PM MUDRA Loan Schmeme

References

External links
 Bank's website
 

Financial services companies based in Mumbai
Small-scale industry in India
Modi administration initiatives
2015 establishments in Maharashtra
Financial services companies established in 2015